Patrick Cruttwell was a literary scholar. He received the Guggenheim Fellowship in 1968. His scholarly works include The Shakespearean Moment and The English Sonnet. His works of fiction include A Kind of Fighting. He was emeritus professor at Carleton University in Ottawa, Ontario, Canada, having previously taught at Kenyon College in Ohio and in California.  Prior to that he taught at Exeter University College (now Exeter University) and prior to the Second World War at Rangoon University.  He edited the Penguin collected writings of Samuel Johnson as well as writing extensively on Shakespeare.

References
 Cruttwell, P. at Modern Library
 The Guggenheim Foundation

Year of birth missing
Year of death missing
Academic staff of Carleton University
Kenyon College faculty